Prasinoxena bilineella is a species of moth in the family Pyralidae. It was described by George Hampson in 1901.

References 

Moths described in 1901
Pyralidae